Refugio Independent School District is a public school district based in Refugio, Texas (USA).

Located in Refugio County, a small portion of the district extends into Bee and Victoria counties.

In 2009, the school district was rated "academically acceptable" by the Texas Education Agency.

History

On July 1, 1994, the McFaddin Independent School District consolidated into the Refugio district.

Schools
Refugio High School (Grades 7-12)
Stricklin Elementary School (Grades K-6)

Athletics
On December 16, 2011 the Refugio Bobcats were victorious in the State Title game against the Cisco Loboes. With a score of 36-35, the Bobcats claimed their third Championship in school history, and the first since 1982. It was Coach Jason Herring's second championship, as he coached the Sonora Broncos to a title in 2000.

Notable alumni
Dan Firova, Major League Baseball player
Jared Kelley, Major League Baseball player

Controversy
In 2011, ESPN's Outside the Lines program highlighted Jason Herring and the Refugio High School football team's preparation for the state playoffs, where they routinely could not avoid running up the score. Having missed the state championship game in three consecutive years, Coach Herring decided to better prepare his team for the postseason, resulting in a heated controversy that even led to death threats to the coach.

References

External links
 

School districts in Refugio County, Texas
School districts in Bee County, Texas
School districts in Victoria County, Texas